The South Asian Microform Project, also known by South Asian Materials Project and SAMP is one of six programs headed by the Center for Research Libraries (CRL) Global network. SAMP preserves higher education material via microform, among other techniques.

Overview 
SAMP is affiliated with the Association for Asian Studies. In 2019 SAMP partnered with JSTOR providing over 500,000 digitized pages freely available as of March 2020.

History 
Early foundations of SAMP began in 1962 by academic scholars and librarians who felt the need to preserve physical material. These individuals formed the Inter-University Committee on South Asian Scholarly Resources at the University of Chicago, led by chairman Robert E. Frykenberg of the University of Wisconsin History Department. These individuals wanted to coordinate the filming and bibliographic control of these materials. Other earlier objects of SAMP included:

 promote cooperative acquisition efforts;
 begin a bibliographic survey of existing South Asian microfilm resources in the U.S.
 maintain a master file and information clearinghouse for these resources;
 assist scholars and librarians in locating filmed materials;
 acquire a portable microfilm unit to be found in India to be used on a rental basis by U.S. scholars; and
 publish a newsletter dealing with microfilm resources

CRL officially founded SAMP in 1967, focusing on materials from India, Pakistan, Bangladesh, Nepal, and Sri Lanka. They primarily specialized in collecting documents that were difficult to achieve, expensive, or of limited quantities. By the end of their first year, SAMP had gathered a total of thirteen items.

Members 
CRL memberships are not required to take part in SAMP. Any institution or nonprofit organization that maintains a library can participate. Members are granted full access to the materials provided by the SAMP. The following is the current list of university members of the SAMP:

 University of British Columbia
 University of California, Berkeley
 University of California, Los Angeles
 Centre for Studies in Social Sciences, Calcutta
 University of Chicago
 Columbia University
 Cornell University
 Duke University
 Emory University
 Harvard University
 University of Hawaii at Manoa
 University of Illinois at Urbana-Champaign
 Indiana University
 University of Iowa
 Kansas State University
 Library of Congress
 Madan Puraskar Pustakalaya
 Michigan State University
 University of Michigan
 University of Minnesota-Twin Cities
 University of Missouri-Columbia
 Mushfiq Khwaja Library and Research Centre
 New York Public Library
 New York University
 North Carolina State University
 University of North Carolina at Chapel Hill
 University of Notre Dame
 Ohio State University
 University of Pennsylvania
 Princeton University
 Roja Muthiah Research Library
 Rutgers University
 Stanford University
 Syracuse University
 University of Texas at Austin
 University of Toronto
 University of Virginia
 Washington University
 University of Washington
 University of Wisconsin-Madison
 Yale University

References

External links 
 CRL: South Asia Microform Project Website

Educational programs